Events from the year 1877 in Sweden

Incumbents
 Monarch – Oscar II
 Prime Minister – Louis Gerhard De Geer

Events

 2 March - The Helga de la Brache affair is completed by a conviction of the de la Brache after her exposure.  
 - Televerket (Sweden) introduces the telephone to the Swedish government.
 - Foundation of the Söderbloms Gjuteri & Mekaniska Verkstad
 - Inauguration of the Tisselskog Church
 - First issue of the Östersunds-Posten
 - Swedish Society for Anthropology and Geography is founded.

Births

 11 January – Oskar Andersson, cartoonist   (died 1906)
 5 November - Märtha Leth, pharmacist (died 1954)

Deaths

 5 February – C. V. A. Strandberg, poet  (born 1818) 
 28 April - Charlotte Pousette, stage actress (born 1832) 
 3 May – Mathilda Berwald, concert singer  (born 1798)
 19 May – Charlotta Djurström, actress and theater manager (born 1807)
 - Edvard Stjernström, stage actor and theater director (born 1816)

References

 
Years of the 19th century in Sweden
Sweden